The 1928 Winter Olympics, referred to by the International Olympic Committee (IOC) as the II Olympic Winter Games, were held in St. Moritz, Switzerland, from February 11 through February 18, 1928. A total of 464 athletes from 25 National Olympic Committees (NOCs) participated in these Games. Overall, 14 events were contested in 8 disciplines. Athletes competed in skeleton for the first time, but unlike the previous Olympic Games there was no curling competition and military patrol was a demonstration event rather than a medal event. Both men and women competed in these Games, although women were only allowed to compete in the figure skating ladies' singles and pairs events.

Eighty-three individual athletes won medals, but the ones representing Norway far surpassed their competitors in the medal count, winning fifteen medals to the six won by the nearest NOC, the United States. The only three other NOCs that had medalists in more than one event were Sweden, Finland, and Austria. Twelve of the 25 participating NOCs secured at least one medal, and among these, six NOCs won at least one gold medal.

Sonja Henie of Norway won the gold medal in the women's individual figure skating competition, the first of three consecutive Winter Olympics where she would do so. She was only 15 years old when she competed at the 1928 Games, setting the record for the youngest person to win an Olympic medal, a record she held for 74 years. Competing with an injured knee, Swedish figure skater Gillis Grafström won the men's individual competition for the third consecutive Winter Games. In the 50–km cross-country skiing competition, Swedish athletes took all three medals. Per-Erik Hedlund won the race, which took place during unusual weather conditions (temperatures rose from 0 to 25 °C [32 to 77 °F]), by a  span of 13 minutes. Norwegian speed skater Bernt Evensen topped the medal count, winning one gold, one silver, and one bronze medal. Four athletes won two medals each: Johan Grøttumsbråten and Ivar Ballangrud of Norway, Clas Thunberg of Finland, and Jennison Heaton of the United States. Both Grøttumsbråten and Thunberg were multiple medal winners in the previous Olympic Games as well.

Bobsleigh

Cross-country skiing

Figure skating

Ice hockey

Nordic combined

Skeleton

Ski jumping

Speed skating

In the 10,000-meter race, Irving Jaffee was leading the competition, having outskated Norwegian defending world champion Bernt Evensen in their heat, when rising temperatures thawed the ice. In a controversial ruling, the Norwegian referee canceled the entire competition. Although the International Olympic Committee reversed the referee's decision and awarded Jaffee the gold medal, the International Skating Union later overruled the IOC and restored the ruling. Evensen, for his part, publicly said that Jaffee should be awarded the gold medal, but that never happened.

Statistics

Medal leaders
Athletes who won multiple medals are listed below.

See also
 1928 Winter Olympics medal table

References

External links

1928 Winter

medal winners